Happie Nuts was a gal fashion magazine published monthly in Japan by Inforest Publishing. Targeted at women in their late teens and early 20s, Happie Nuts was highly oriented toward the style of oneh-gal ("o-neh-san gal", lit. "older-sister gal") and dark-skin. Based in Tokyo, it was in circulation between 2004 and 2016.

History
Happie Nuts was first published in November 2004 as the successor to Happie, a fashion magazine targeted at female teenagers. Happie Nuts spawned its special edition, Koakuma & Nuts, in October 2005, which later grew to be Koakuma Ageha as one of the highest-selling fashion magazines in Japan.

In 2014 Happie Nuts was closed, but was restarted in July 2015. However, the magazine ended publication again in March 2016.

Model
Its exclusive models were called "Nuts Mates", which have included Ena Matsumoto, Sayoko Ozaki, Akane Satomi, Sayaka Taniguchi, Miyu Ishima, Saki Nanba, Eriko Tachiya, Shizuka Takeda, Hiromi, Akane Suda, and Nicole Abe.

References

External
Happie Nuts Official Website 
Fashion Tips On Cocktail Dresses For Party

2004 establishments in Japan
2016 disestablishments in Japan
Defunct women's magazines published in Japan
Fashion magazines published in Japan
Gyaru
Magazines established in 2004
Magazines disestablished in 2016
Magazines published in Tokyo
Monthly magazines published in Japan
Women's fashion magazines